The Ponziani Opening is a chess opening that begins with the moves:
1. e4 e5
2. Nf3 Nc6
3. c3

It is one of the oldest chess openings, having been discussed in the literature by 1497. It was advocated by Howard Staunton, generally considered the world's strongest player from 1843 to 1851, in his 1847 book The Chess-Player's Handbook. For some decades, it was often called "Staunton's Opening" or the "English Knight's Game" as a result. Today, it is usually known by the name of Domenico Lorenzo Ponziani, whose main contribution to the opening was his introduction, in 1769, of the  3...f5

The opening is now considered inferior to 3.Bb5, the Ruy Lopez, and 3.Bc4, the Italian Game, and is accordingly rarely seen today at any level of play. Magnus Carlsen used it for a victory in 2013. Black's main responses are 3...Nf6, leading to  play, and 3...d5, leading to  play. Ponziani's countergambit 3...f5!? was successfully played in the grandmaster game Hikaru Nakamura–Julio Becerra Rivero, US Championship 2007.

History
The Ponziani is one of the oldest known openings, having been first discussed in chess literature by no later than 1497. It was mentioned in both of the earliest chess treatises: the Repetición de Amores y Arte de Ajedrez con ci Iuegos de Partido by Lucena and the Göttingen manuscript. Today the opening bears the surname of Domenico Lorenzo Ponziani. Although Ponziani did analyze the opening in 1769, his principal contribution was the introduction of the  3...f5!? Later the opening was favored by Howard Staunton, who in The Chess-Player's Handbook (1847) called it "so full of interest and variety, that its omission in many of the leading works on the game is truly unaccountable. ... it deserves, and, if we mistake not, will yet attain a higher place in the category of legitimate openings than has hitherto been assigned to it."

Nomenclature
Staunton cumbersomely referred to the opening as "The Queen's Bishop's Pawn Game in the King's Knight's Opening", as did George H. D. Gossip in The Chess Player's Manual (1888, American edition 1902). Napoleon Marache, one of the leading American players, similarly called it the "Queen's Bishop's Pawn Game" in his 1866 manual. In their treatise Chess Openings Ancient and Modern (1889, 1896), E. Freeborough and the Reverend C.E. Ranken called it "Staunton's Opening". In an appendix to later editions of Staunton's work, R.F. Green, editor of  British Chess Magazine, also called it "Staunton's Opening", directing those seeking a definition of "Ponziani's Game" to the former name. Green referred to 3...f5 as "Ponziani's Counter Gambit". Chess historian H. J. R. Murray in his celebrated 1913 work A History of Chess called the opening simply the "Staunton", explaining that he was using "the ordinary names of the Openings as used by English players of the present day". James Mason in his treatise The Art of Chess (Fourth Edition c. 1910?) referred to the opening as the "Ponziani–Staunton Attack". The famous German Handbuch des Schachspiels, which went through eight editions between 1843 and 1916, called it the "Englisches Springerspiel" (English Knight's Game). The Reverend E.E. Cunnington in The Modern Chess Primer (Thirteenth Edition 1933) referred to it as the "Ponziani Opening (sometimes called Staunton's)".

Wilhelm Steinitz, the first World Champion, in his 1895 treatise The Modern Chess Instructor (Part II), called the opening the "Ponziani Opening", as did his successor, Emanuel Lasker, in Lasker's Manual of Chess. Similarly, Frank Marshall in Chess Openings, the authors of Modern Chess Openings (Second Edition 1913), and Siegbert Tarrasch in The Game of Chess (1931, English translation 1938) called it "Ponziani's Opening". William Cook in The Chess Players' Compendium (Fifth Edition 1910) called it "Ponziani's Game", while Francis Joseph Lee and Gossip in The Complete Chess – Guide (1903) called it "Ponziani's Knight's Game". Contemporary authors likewise call it the "Ponziani Opening", "Ponziani's Opening", or simply the "Ponziani".

Introduction and overview

The Ponziani is rarely played today except as a surprise weapon, because Black has the pleasant choice between  easily and attempting to obtain an advantage with sharper play. White's third move prepares to build a powerful  with 4.d4, a logical objective also seen in the more popular Ruy Lopez and Giuoco Piano. On the positive side, the move 3.c3 creates a second diagonal for the white queen.

As early as 1904, Marshall wrote that, "There is no point in White's third move unless Black plays badly. ... White practically surrenders the privilege of the first move." More recently, Graham Burgess called the Ponziani "a relic from a bygone age, popular neither at top level nor at club level". Bruce Pandolfini has said, Curiously, every great teacher of openings who investigated the Ponziani has concluded that it leads to interesting play and deserves to be played more often. Yet it has never captured the fancy of chessplayers in general, and it remains to be seen whether the Ponziani is an opening of the past or of the future.

In Chess Master vs. Chess Amateur, Max Euwe and Walter Meiden wrote, "What should one do with this opening? It is no opening for beginners, because tactics predominate in the play. There are no simple strategic principles to govern the general lines in this opening."

Variations

After 1.e4 e5 2.Nf3 Nc6 3.c3 the main continuations are:
 3...Nf6, the Jaenisch Variation is considered Black's safest course and probably a deterrent to possible Ponziani adopters because positions arise ranging from the highly chaotic to dull passiveness. White continues 4.d4, consistent with 3.c3.
 4...Nxe4 often continues 5.d5 Ne7 (5...Nb8 is also ; Black even may invest a knight with 5...Bc5 6.dxc6 Bxf2+ 7.Ke2 Bb6 8.Qd5 Nf2 9.Rg1 0-0 10.cxb7 Bxb7 11.Qxb7 Qf6 12.Na3 e4 13.Nc4 Rab8 14.Qd5 exf3+ 15.gxf3 Rfe8+ 16.Kd2 Ne4+ 17.fxe4 Bxg1=) 6.Nxe5 Ng6, (not 6...d6 when 7.Bb5+ wins ) and now either 7.Qd4 Qf6 8.Qxe4 Qxe5, a relatively new try 7.Qf3, or 7.Nxg6 hxg6 8.Qe2 Qe7 9.Bf4 d6 10.Na3 Rh5 11.0-0-0 Rf5 leads to equality according to MCO-15.
 4...exd4, Black can also play this move leading to a position that can arise in the Göring Gambit, meeting 5.e5 with either 5...Nd5 or 5...Ne4, leading to more double-edged play than after 4...Nxe4.
 3...d5 is an aggressive response, striking back in the center. Usually in King's Pawn openings an early ...d5 by Black would lose a tempo after exd5 Qxd5 when White plays Nc3 attacking the black queen. Here however, White is deprived of the move Nc3 as the c3-square is occupied by a pawn.
 4.Bb5 is considered inferior to 4.Qa4 but the game becomes sharp with chances for both sides, although Black may emerge with advantage after 4...dxe4! 5.Nxe5 Qg5! 6. Qa4 Qxg2 7. Rf1 Bh3.
 4.Qa4, White indirectly threatens the e5-pawn by pinning the knight. Black must choose either to defend the e5-pawn with 4...f6 or 4...Qd6, or be prepared to sacrifice a pawn with either 4...Bd7 or 4...Nf6.
 4...Bd7, the Caro Variation, an unconvincing variation according to Euwe after 5.exd5 Nd4 6.Qd1 Nxf3 7.Qxf3 Black has gambited a pawn with an unclear position.
 4...Qd6, protecting e5 without weakening the pawn structure. Batsford Chess Openings 2 gives the move an exclamation mark but does not mention the reply 5.d4, the main move in the later Nunn's Chess Openings.
 4...Nf6, the Leonhardt Variation. White can now gain material with 5.Nxe5, with theory giving 5...Bd6 6.Nxc6 bxc6 7.d3 0-0 8.Be2 Re8 where Black has compensation for the pawn.
 4...f6, the Steinitz Variation, protecting the central e5-pawn is considered  and best, but unnatural because it deprives the black knight of f6. The line can continue 5.Bb5 Nge7 6.exd5 Qxd5 with either 7.d4 Bd7 or 7.0-0 Bd7 and an equal position.
 3...f5, the Ponziani Countergambit, is an aggressive Black response originally suggested by the 18th-century Italian writer, Ponziani. In 1951, Boris Spassky chose this countergambit against Yakov Estrin. The countergambit is considered better for White after 4.d4 fxe4 5.Nxe5 Qf6 6.Ng4 Qg6 7.Bf4 or 5...Nf6 6.Bg5.
 3...Nge7, the unusual Kmoch Variation, was advocated by Hans Kmoch. According to Reuben Fine, citing analysis by Kmoch, Black equalizes after 4.d4 exd4 5.Bc4 d5 6.exd5 Nxd5 7.0-0 Be7 8.Nxd4 Nxd4 9.cxd4 Be6.
3...d6 reinforces the e5-pawn and intends to show that c3 was unnecessary. It is considered passive, however, and does not present White with any problems. After 4.Bc4, Black's most common responses are 4...g6, 4...Be6, and 4...Bg4.

Illustrative games
Here is a quiet draw typical of the 3...Nf6 line:

V. Medvedev (2365) vs. Charles Milgram (2375), ICCF 1991 1. e4 e5 2. Nf3 Nc6 3. c3 Nf6 4. d4 Nxe4 5. d5 Ne7 6. Nxe5 Ng6 7. Qd4 Qf6 8. Qxe4 Qxe5 9. Qxe5+ Nxe5 10. Nd2 d6 11. Nc4 Nxc4 12. Bxc4 Be7 13. 0-0 0-0 14. Re1 Bf6 15. Be3 Bd7 

While this game was agreed drawn there are good winning chances for White in this type of endgame.

The variation 1.e4 e5 2.Nf3 Nc6 3.c3 Nge7 has been attributed to Reti due to him having tried it against Tartakower and lost. Recent analysis gives White the edge, i.e. 1.e4 e5 2.Nf3 Nc6 3.c3 Nge7 4.Bc4 (immediately targeting f7) d5 5.exd5 Nxd5 and now either 6.0-0 or 6.Qb3 lead to a White advantage. Also playable for White is 4.Bb5 which transposes to a line of the Cozio Defense to the Ruy Lopez.

Here are two games illustrating the wild tactical play that often develops in the 3...d5 4.Qa4 f6 5.Bb5 Ne7 line:

 Mikhail Chigorin vs. George H.D. Gossip, New York 1889: 1. e4 e5 2. Nf3 Nc6 3. c3 d5 3...Nf6 is the safest response if Black is not well versed in the ensuing complications—as Gossip proves not to be. 4. Qa4 f6 5. Bb5 Ne7 6. exd5 Qxd5 7. 0-0 7.d4! is the main line today. 7... Bd7 7...e4! 8.Ne1 Bf5 9.f3 leads to equality. 8. d4 e4 9. Nfd2 Ng6? 9...f5! or 9...0-0-0 was better. 10. Bc4 Qa5 11. Qb3 f5? 11...0-0-0! was the best chance. 12. Bf7+ Ke7? 12...Kd8 is forced. 13. Nc4! Setting up a problem-like finish. 13... Qa6 14. Bg5+! Kxf7 15. Nd6#  Black's king cannot escape the double check.
 S. Kaouras vs. R. Vorlop, e-mail 2003: 1. e4 Nc6 2. Nf3 e5 3. c3 d5 4. Qa4 f6 5. Bb5 Nge7 6. exd5 Qxd5 7. d4 7.0–0 is considered the main line, e.g. 7...Bd7 8.d4 a6!? (8...exd4 9.cxd4 Ne5 10.Bxd7+ Qxd7 is equal) 9.c4 Qf7 10.d5 Nb8 11.Bxd7+ Nxd7 12.Nc3 Nf5 13.b4 gave White the advantage in S. Hassan–B. Amin, Cairo 2003. 7... e4 Alternatives are the old move, 7...Bd7, and 7...Bg4, which is currently popular at the international level. 8. c4 Qd7 9. Nfd2 Qxd4 10. 0–0 Bd7 11. Nc3 a6 12. Nb3 Qe5 13. c5 f5 14. g3 Ng6 15. Rd1 Be7 16. Bc4 Nd4 Now White appears to be in deep trouble. 17. Qxd7+! The best practical choice, which inspires White to play very aggressively. 17... Kxd7 18. Be3 Nh4 If 18...Kc8, 19.Bxd4 traps Black's queen. 19. gxh4 Kc8 20. Bxd4 White has three pieces for the queen and the initiative; Black's pieces are uncoordinated. 20... Qf4 21. Be6+ Kb8 22. Ne2 Qf3 23. Ng3 Bxh4 24. Be3 g6 24...f4? 25.Nd2 traps the queen. 25. Rd7 Bf6 26. c6 b5 27. Rd5 Re8 28. Nc5 Bg7 29. Rad1! Ka7 30. Rd7 Be5 31. Bxf5 gxf5 32. Nb7+ Qxe3 33. fxe3 Having regained the queen, White has a winning  advantage. 33... f4 34. exf4 Bxf4 35. Nd6 Bxd6 36. R1xd6 Kb6 37. Rd1 Re6 38. Re1 e3 39. Rxh7 Rae8 40. Rg7 Kxc6 41. Re2 Re5 42. Nf1 Kd5 43. Kg2 c5 44. Rg3 Kd4 45. h4 c4 46. Rexe3 Rxe3 47. Nxe3 Kd3 48. Kh3 Kd2 49. Nd5 Kc1 50. Rg2 Re5 51. Nf4 b4 52. h5 Kb1 53. h6 Re8 54. Kg4 Rh8 55. Kg5 c3 56. bxc3 bxc3 57. Rh2 c2 58. Nd3 1–0 Notes based on those by International Master Gary Lane.

See also
 List of chess openings
 List of chess openings named after people

Notes

References

Further reading

Chess openings
18th century in chess